Giulio Masetti (died 2 September 1592) was a Roman Catholic prelate who served as Bishop of Reggio Emilia (1585–1592).

Biography
On 7 October 1585, Giulio Masetti was appointed during the papacy of Pope Sixtus V as Bishop of Reggio Emilia.
On 13 October 1585, he was consecrated bishop by Giulio Antonio Santorio, Cardinal-Priest of San Bartolomeo all'Isola. He served as Bishop of Reggio Emilia until his death on 2 September 1592.

While bishop, he was the principal co-consecrator of Girolamo Bernerio, Bishop of Ascoli Piceno.

References

External links and additional sources
 (for Chronology of Bishops) 
 (for Chronology of Bishops) 

16th-century Italian Roman Catholic bishops
Bishops appointed by Pope Sixtus V
1592 deaths